The Alfred G. Vanderbilt Handicap is a Grade I American thoroughbred horse race for horses age three and older over a distance of six furlongs on the dirt held annually in late July at Saratoga Race Course in Saratoga Springs, New York.

History

The inaugural running of the event was on 17 August 1985 as the A Phenomenon Stakes, the sixth event on the card that day and was won by
the Richard E. Dutrow Sr. trained Cognizant who won in a time of 1:09. The event was named after the winner of the 1983 Jim Dandy Stakes at Saratoga, A Phenomenon. A Phenomenon suffered a life ending injury in the 1984 Forego Handicap.

The event was classified as Grade III in 1990 and in 1995 upgraded to Grade II.

In 2000, the event was renamed to honor Alfred Gwynne Vanderbilt Jr. who had died in 1999. Vanderbilt was a very prominent Thoroughbred owner who also served as Chairman of the Board of the New York Racing Association from 1971 to 1975.

In 2010 the event was upgraded to Grade I. 

The 2019 winner Imperial Hint set a new track record for the six furlongs distance winning for the second time in a time of 1:07.92.

Records
Speed  record:
 1:07.92 – Imperial Hint (2019)

Margins
 8 lengths – El Deal (2017)

Most wins:
 2 – Cognizant (1985, 1986)
 2 – Imperial Hint (2018, 2019)

Most wins by a jockey:
 4 – Pat Day (1985, 1986, 1992, 1993)
 4 – Javier Castellano (2015, 2017, 2018, 2019)

Most wins by a trainer:
 4 – Steven M. Asmussen (2010, 2013, 2020, 2022)

Most wins by an owner:
 2 – Happy Valley Farm (1985, 1986)
 2 – H. Joseph Allen (1988, 2006)
 2 – Shadwell Racing (1999, 2008)
 2 – Raymond Mamone (2018, 2019)

Winners

Notes:

† In the 2000 running Intidab cross the finish line first but was later disqualification, Successful Appeal was declared the winner.

See also
List of American and Canadian Graded races

References

Grade 1 stakes races in the United States
Open sprint category horse races
Horse races in New York (state)
Recurring sporting events established in 1985
Saratoga Race Course
1985 establishments in New York (state)